The Faisalabad–Shahkot–Sheikhupura Road (Punjabi), also known locally as Sheikhupura Road is a provincially maintained road in Punjab province of Pakistan that extends from Faisalabad to Sheikhupura via Shahkot.

Features
 Distance between Faisalabad - Shahkot = 43 km (27 mi) 
 Distance between Shahkot - Sheikhupura = 52 km (32 mi)
 Total distance = 95 km
 Lanes = 6
 Speed limit = 80 km/h (maximum speed limit of 100 km/h for heavy transport vehicles and 120 km/h for light transport vehicles)

References

Roads in Punjab, Pakistan
Transport in Faisalabad District